The men's 77 kilograms event at the 2014 World Weightlifting Championships was held on 11 and 12 November 2014 in Baluan Sholak Sports Palace, Almaty, Kazakhstan.

Daniel Godelli was the original gold medalist with a total of 369 kg, but was later disqualified due to one of his samples testing positive for the use of the steroid Stanozolol.

Schedule

Medalists

Records

Results

References

Results 

2014 World Weightlifting Championships